The Battle of Rhode Island Site is the partially preserved location of the Battle of Rhode Island, fought August 29, 1778 during the American Revolutionary War.  The battle took place in the town of Portsmouth, Rhode Island, located on Aquidneck Island north of Newport, and was the only major action of the war that took place in Rhode Island.  It was also significant as the only battle of the war in which an entirely segregated unit of African-American soldiers fought.  At the time of the action, the 1st Rhode Island Regiment consisted of companies of locally recruited African Americans and Native Americans with white officers.  The two main areas associated with the battle were designated a National Historic Landmark in 1974.

History

In December 1776, a British force occupied Newport, Rhode Island.  France decided to enter the war as an ally of the United States following the pivotal Battles of Saratoga in September and October 1777.  The two militaries then sought possibilities for working together to defeat the British in North America.  The first significant effort in this regard took place in July 1778, when a French fleet commanded by the Comte d'Estaing arrived off the east coast of North America.  The ships originally were ordered to blockade Delaware Bay, but d'Estaing altered his target to New York City after learning that the British had evacuated the city of Philadelphia.  However, he concluded that the bar at the mouth of New York Harbor was such that his largest ships could not safely enter.  As a result, French and American military leaders decided to operate against the British at Newport.

American Continental Army forces were dispatched to Rhode Island, and militia were raised from surrounding states to assist in the effort.  A storm arose at a critical moment when the French and British fleets were about to do battle, scattering both fleets.  By this time, the American forces led by Major General John Sullivan had already occupied the northern end of Aquidneck Island (called Rhode Island at the time).  The French fleet withdrew on August 22 to Boston to repair, while Sullivan engaged in preliminary siege operations against Newport.

The French withdrawal prompted an exodus of militia from the American camp.  News also arrived that a relief force was being organized by the British in New York, so Sullivan decided to withdraw from Aquidneck Island.  Newport's British commander Major General Robert Pigot led his forces out of Newport in pursuit and engaged the American forces on August 29 in the Battle of Rhode Island.  The battle was tactically inconclusive in its outcome. The British failed to overwhelm the American force, which continued its orderly retreat from the island.

Battlefield
This area is sparsely populated today, and had few structures at the time of the battle. Turkey Hill was one of the major objectives of the British advance, and Lehigh Hill was one of the anchors of the American line. Barker Brook was an area that saw intense fighting, now largely obscured due to the construction of Rhode Island Route 24.

It was fortified with earthworks and served as a command post and fall-back defensive position for the Americans.

African-American participation

The 1st Rhode Island Regiment was raised in early 1778 as a specifically African-American unit in order to help meet the state's obligations for manning the Continental Army.  The unit joined Sullivan's force in Providence in July 1778 and participated in the occupation of Aquidneck Island.  When the battle lines were drawn, the 1st Rhode Island was placed on Turkey Hill, the rightmost end of the American front line.  The British made three separate assaults on Turkey Hill and were repulsed each time.  The 1st Rhode Island suffered relatively light casualties with one killed and ten wounded, despite the severity of the action.  This is attributed at least in part to the strong defensive position afforded by the hill.

The Rhode Island legislature repealed the act allowing African Americans to enlist in June 1778. The unit thereafter began to lose membership due to attrition and combat, which was compensated for by adding white recruits.  Rhode Island's two regiments merged in January 1780, resulting in an integrated unit for the remainder of the war.

Legacy
The battleground site and the fort at Butts Hill were declared National Historic Landmarks and listed on the National Register of Historic Places in 1974. The site includes two separate areas.

See also

List of National Historic Landmarks in Rhode Island
National Register of Historic Places listings in Newport County, Rhode Island

Gallery

References

Sources

National Historic Landmarks in Rhode Island
American Revolutionary War sites
Conflict sites on the National Register of Historic Places in Rhode Island
Portsmouth, Rhode Island
American Revolution on the National Register of Historic Places
National Register of Historic Places in Newport County, Rhode Island